Daniel Kirkpatrick (born 28 November 1988) is a New Zealand rugby union player. He has also played for Auckland in the Mitre 10 Cup.

Prior to his 2012 move to France, he played for the Hurricanes in Super Rugby and for Hawkes Bay in the ITM Cup. He made his Hurricanes debut in 2009. In 2010 he played for the Auckland Blues, before returning to Wellington in 2011.

He was a part of the team that won the 2007 IRB U19 World Championship in Belfast, and the New Zealand U20 team that contested the IRB U20 World Cup in Wales.

In 2012 it was announced that he had signed with French club Castres.

He signed with SC Albi in 2016.

Honours

Club 
 Castres
Top 14: 2012–13

References

External links

1988 births
Living people
New Zealand rugby union players
Hurricanes (rugby union) players
Blues (Super Rugby) players
Wellington rugby union players
Hawke's Bay rugby union players
Auckland rugby union players
Castres Olympique players
People educated at Napier Boys' High School
Rugby union fly-halves
Rugby union players from Napier, New Zealand
New Zealand expatriate rugby union players
New Zealand expatriate sportspeople in France
Expatriate rugby union players in France